{{Infobox song
| name       = Confesados.com
| cover      = confesadosoficial.jpg
| alt        =
| type       = single
| artist     = Ednita Nazario
| album      = Soy
| released   = January 11, 2010
| recorded   = 2009
| studio     =
| venue      =
| genre      = Pop, Latin Pop
| length     = 4:06
| label      = Sony BMG
| writer     = Tommy Torres
| producer   =
| prev_title = Sin Querer''
| prev_year  = 2009
| next_title = La Fuerza De Un Te Quiero| next_year  = 2010
| misc       = 
}}

"Confesados'''" is the second single of Ednita Nazario's album Soy. According to Ednita Nazario, this composition is one of their favorites. The ballad is clearly erotic, though not explicit, we portray the game before an intimate encounter.

Music video 
The cold that has prevailed in recent days in what is called the Sun City became his accomplice as during the long hours of recording many times the heat becomes unbearable. One of the oldest buildings in Downtown Miami, which is now abandoned, was the place chosen to give lim     esto es una mierda

Charts

References 

2009 singles
Ednita Nazario songs
Songs written by Tommy Torres
2009 songs
Sony Music Latin singles